Čechy is a village and municipality in the Nové Zámky District in the Nitra Region of south-west Slovakia.

History 
In historical records the village was first mentioned in 1419 as Felsewchey, then in 1497 as Superior Chey. Later, it was referred to as Csehi, when in the end of the 19th century it was changed to Komáromcsehi. As part of Czechoslovakia, the name became Čechy.

Geography 
The municipality lies at an altitude of 162 metres and covers an area of 11.846 km². It has a population of about 330 people.

Ethnicity 
The population is about 98% Slovak.

Facilities 
The village has a small public library and football pitch.

People 
 Andor Jaross

Genealogical resources

The records for genealogical research are available at the state archive "Statny Archiv in Nitra, Slovakia"

 Roman Catholic church records (births/marriages/deaths): 1725-1895 (parish B)
 Lutheran church records (births/marriages/deaths): 1785-1896 (parish B)
 Reformated church records (births/marriages/deaths): 1815-1945 (parish B)

See also
 List of municipalities and towns in Slovakia

External links 
 https://web.archive.org/web/20070513023228/http://www.statistics.sk/mosmis/eng/run.html
Surnames of living people in Cechy
Čechy – Nové Zámky okolie

Villages and municipalities in Nové Zámky District